Neurolixis is a biopharmaceutical company focused on novel drugs for the treatment of human central nervous system diseases.

Neurolixis Inc. was founded in 2011 by Mark A. Varney, PhD, and Adrian Newman-Tancredi, PhD, DSc. (Chief Executive Officer ). The company's therapeutic focus is on CNS disorders including Parkinson's disease, neurological orphan disorders, depression and cognitive deficits. The company has offices in USA and in France.

In September 2013, Neurolixis in-licensed two clinical-phase drugs from Pierre Fabre Laboratories, a French pharmaceutical company. The drugs (befiradol and F-15599) are targeted to the treatment of dyskinesia in Parkinson's disease and to breathing deficits in Rett syndrome, respectively. In addition, Neurolixis is developing its own novel chemical entities (NCEs).

Neurolixis has been awarded a series of research grants by the Michael J. Fox Foundation and by Parkinson's UK. Neurolixis undertook research examining the effects of novel, highly selective and efficacious serotonergic drugs targeting 5-HT1A receptors in brain regions relevant to therapeutic properties in Parkinson's disease. The Michael J. Fox Foundation subsequently announced that it was supporting proof-of-principle studies on befiradol (also known as NLX-112) in models of Parkinson's disease and showcased Neurolixis in its Partnering Program. In January 2018, the British charity Parkinson's UK announced that it had awarded Neurolixis a grant to advance development of befiradol up to clinical phase in Parkinson's disease patients. In March 2019, Neurolixis announced that the US Food and Drug Administration (FDA) gave a positive response to Neurolixis' Investigational New Drug (IND) application for befiradol to be tested in a Phase 2 clinical study in Parkinson's disease patients with troublesome Levodopa-induced dyskinesia. Studies published in 2020 using non-human primate models of Parkinson's disease, (MPTP-treated marmosets and MPTP-treated macaques), found that befiradol potently reduced Levodopa-induced dyskinesia at oral doses as low as 0.1 to 0.4 mg/kg.

On 22 November 2020, The Sunday Times reported that the two charities, Parkinson's UK and Michael J. Fox Foundation, were jointly investing $2 million to support a clinical trial on befiradol in Parkinson's disease patients with troublesome Levodopa-induced dyskinesia, a potentially "life changing" drug. On 23 November 2020, Parkinson's UK and Michael J. Fox Foundation, confirmed their funding in an official announcement.

F-15599 (also known as NLX-101) was awarded Orphan Drug Status by the United States Food and Drug Administration (FDA) in October 2013 and Orphan Medicinal Product designation by the European Medicines Agency in March 2014. 
In collaboration with researchers at the University of Bristol, Neurolixis has been awarded a grant by the International Rett Syndrome Foundation to study F-15599 in animal models of Rett syndrome. In June 2015, Neurolixis was awarded a grant by the Rett Syndrome Research Trust to advance F-15599 to clinical development. Subsequent studies on F-15599 investigated its functional selectivity (also referred to as 'biased agonism') at cortical serotonin 5-HT1A receptors using brain imaging techniques in rat: functional magnetic resonance imaging and positron emission tomography. The functional selectivity of F-15599 was considered to underlie its rapid-acting antidepressant-like activity in the 'chronic mild stress' (CMS) model of depression. F-15599 reversed CMS-induced anhedonia (measured as a deficit in sucrose solution consumption) after a single day of treatment.

In addition to developing befiradol and F-15599, Neurolixis is also developing its own novel chemical entities (NCEs) in collaboration with a team at Jagiellonian University in Krakow, Poland. Scientists from Neurolixis and Jagiellonian University filed a patent application on the NCEs in 2016, and it issued in the USA under patent number US10562853B2. The NCEs are selective serotonin 5-HT1A receptor agonists that show functional selectivity for either extracellular signal-regulated kinases activation or for beta arrestin activation. It has been suggested that such compounds may have utility for treatment of distinct CNS disorders.

References 

Pharmaceutical companies of the United States
Biotechnology companies of the United States